Disintegrin and metalloproteinase domain-containing protein 9 is an enzyme that in humans is encoded by the ADAM9 gene.

Function 

This gene encodes a member of the ADAM (a disintegrin and metalloprotease domain) family. Members of this family are membrane-anchored proteins structurally related to snake venom disintegrins, and have been implicated in a variety of biological processes involving cell-cell and cell-matrix interactions, including fertilization, muscle development, and neurogenesis. The protein encoded by this gene interacts with SH3 domain-containing proteins, binds mitotic arrest deficient 2 beta protein, and is also involved in TPA-induced ectodomain shedding of membrane-anchored heparin-binding EGF-like growth factor. Two alternative splice variants have been identified, encoding distinct isoforms.

Interactions 

ADAM9 has been shown to interact with:
 MAD2L2, 
 SH3GL2, and
 SNX9

References

Further reading

External links
 ADAM9 on the Atlas of Genetics and Oncology
 

Proteases
EC 3.4.24